Eyprepocnemis is a genus of grasshoppers in the subfamily Eyprepocnemidinae with species found in Africa, Southern Europe through to tropical Asia.

Species
The Catalogue of Life lists:

Eyprepocnemis aberrans Willemse, 1957
Eyprepocnemis abyssinica Uvarov, 1921
Eyprepocnemis alacris Serville, 1838
Eyprepocnemis bhadurii Bhowmik, 1965
Eyprepocnemis brachyptera Bruner, 1910
Eyprepocnemis burmana Ramme, 1941
Eyprepocnemis burtti Dirsh, 1958
Eyprepocnemis calceata Serville, 1838
Eyprepocnemis chloropus Ramme, 1952
Eyprepocnemis cinerea Blanchard, 1853
Eyprepocnemis cyanescens Uvarov, 1942
Eyprepocnemis deserticolus Uvarov, 1933
Eyprepocnemis djeboboensis Jago, 1962
Eyprepocnemis dorsalensis Roy, 1964
Eyprepocnemis hokutensis Shiraki, 1910
Eyprepocnemis javana Willemse, 1933
Eyprepocnemis kalkudensis Henry, 1937
Eyprepocnemis keniensis Johnston, 1937
Eyprepocnemis montana Chopard, 1945
Eyprepocnemis montigena Johnston, 1937
Eyprepocnemis noxia Dirsh, 1950
Eyprepocnemis perbrevipennis Bi & Xia, 1984
Eyprepocnemis phronusa Brancsik, 1893
Eyprepocnemis plorans Charpentier, 1825 - type species (as Gryllus plorans Charpentier = E. plorans plorans)
Eyprepocnemis pulchra Bolívar, 1902
Eyprepocnemis poggii Massa, 2018
Eyprepocnemis reducta Johnsen, 1984
Eyprepocnemis rentzi Balderson & Yin, 1987
Eyprepocnemis roseus Uvarov, 1942
Eyprepocnemis schultzei Roy, 1964
Eyprepocnemis schulzei Roy, 1964
Eyprepocnemis smaragdipes Bruner, 1910
Eyprepocnemis unicolor Tarbinsky, 1928
Eyprepocnemis vulcanigena Jago, 1962
Eyprepocnemis yunkweiensis Chang, 1937
Eyprepocnemis yunnanensis Zheng, Lian & Xi, 1982

Gallery

References

External links
 
 

Acrididae
Insects of Southeast Asia
Orthoptera of Africa
Orthoptera of Europe